Nupserha sericea is a species of beetle in the family Cerambycidae. It was described by Stephan von Breuning in 1955.

References

sericea
Beetles described in 1955